Estadio Sergio León Chávez is a Multi-purpose stadium in the city of Irapuato.

It is currently used mostly for football matches. The stadium holds 25,000
people.  The stadium was built in 1967 and hosted three matches in group C of the FIFA World Cup in 1986.

History

Before the stadium was built Irapuato had the Estadio Revolución which was home to Irapuato FC. The stadium broke ground in 1967 and construction lasted two years. It was founded on 23 May 1969, simply as Estadio Irapuato, gaining its actual name on 4 January 1990, in honour of the former club's president. in October 1968 even before the stadium was completed Irapuato FC invited Spain to play a friendly against them in preparation for the 1968 Summer Olympics its first game played in the stadium, Spain would win the match 1–3. the first person to score in the new stadium was Juan Manuel Asensi from Spain. on 24 May 1970 the Brazil national football team played a friendly vs Irapuato FC in that match the Brazilians beat Irapuato 3–0 with goals from Roberto Rivelino, Roberto Miranda and Caju. Pelé was present in that match.

Two International football Tournaments have been played in the Sergio Leon Chavez.
 1986 FIFA World Cup
 1983 FIFA World Youth Championship

1986 FIFA World Cup
The Estadio Morelos in Morelia, Michoacán was originally going to be one of the venues for the world cup but due to problems in the building of the stadium led to the suspension of the work, The World Cup site was then transferred to the Estadio Sergio León Chávez.

During the 1983 FIFA World Youth Championship Tournament FIFA wanted to see whether Irapuato had what it took to host the FIFA World Cup, In 1985 the stadium was expanded and the capacity went from 16,300 to 33,000.

From 1983 to 1985 several national teams played friendly matches in Irapuato. Also during the 1986 World Cup the Soviets used Irapuato as their training facility.

1986 FIFA World Cup Group C

1983 FIFA World Youth Championship

Other Internationals Played In Irapuato

References

1986 FIFA World Cup stadiums
Football venues in Mexico
Sports venues in Guanajuato
Sports venues completed in 1969
Irapuato
1969 establishments in Mexico